The Arizona Historical Society (AHS) is a non-profit organization whose mission is to connect people through the power of Arizona's history. It does this through four regional divisions. Each division has a representative museum. The statewide divisions are as follows: Southern Arizona Division in Tucson, the Central Arizona Division in Tempe, the Northern Arizona Division in Flagstaff, and the Rio Colorado Division in Yuma. It was founded in 1884.

History of the Historical Society

The group was founded  as the Society of Arizona Pioneers on January 31, 1884, by physician John C. Handy, his father-in-law William Fisher Scott, and 58 other Tucson pioneers.

With a new railroad being built and change on its way to Tucson, Arizona, pioneers worried that their stories of battles with the desert heat and the Apaches would be lost forever. The society was founded to preserve these stories and provide charitable service work to the local community as a mutual aid society. Original Historical Society members were often prominent members of the community, and their tasks with the society included attending funerals and raising money to help out widows.

Over time, the Society evolved to provide storage for official state papers and collect the histories of many Arizona citizens. The society has faced several periods of financial difficulty, and difficulty storing their collections safely. Collections expanded beyond the capacity of facilities several times, until a large, block-long basement was created to store records and documents at the current Main Museum.

, the Society maintained several museums in the state with the financial support of over 3000 members and dozens of volunteers.

Museums

Flagstaff

 Arizona Historical Society Pioneer Museum –  located in the historic Coconino County Hospital for the Indigent. Exhibits include local history, ranching, logging, transportation and pioneer life.
 Riordan Mansion State Historic Park – the Society manages the early 20th-century Arts and Crafts style mansion for the state.

Tempe
 Arizona Historical Society Museum at Papago Park – Exhibits focus on the state's history in the 20th and 21st centuries, including World War II, the rise of desert cities, Arizona pop culture, sports, and the state's geology.

Tucson
 Arizona History Museum – The largest AHS museum in the state, the Arizona History Museum frequently rotates its exhibits on Arizona history. Permanent displays include southern Arizona history from Spanish colonial through territorial eras, mining and transportation.

 Downtown Tucson Museum – Exhibits featuring early downtown Tucson, including artifacts from a barbershop, hotel and drugstore. Leisure activities are also explored with exhibits that discuss music, theater, dance halls, gambling, and church in Tucson.
 Fort Lowell Museum – The Fort Lowell park actually is the site of what used to be Fort Lowell. Part of the medical wing of the fort still stands, as well as the trees planted to mark the road to the fort. A small museum is located at the park and it contains exhibits related to the fort history and military history in Tucson in general. Uniforms and photographs of military life show viewers what life used to be like at Fort Lowell.
 Sosa-Carrillo-Fremont House – 1870s adobe house, open by appointment

Yuma
 Sanguinetti House Museum and Gardens – 1870s period adobe house

Library and archives
The Arizona Historical Society currently houses a large collection of published and unpublished historical documents in its library and archives division. The collections are divided among 4 locations in Arizona, with each location specializing in certain aspects of history. The society lists its collection specialties as follows:

"Tucson Collections Strengths: Territorial era, Southern Arizona and borderlands, business, genealogy, ranching, politics, mining, military, law, non-profit and grass roots organizations, ephemera, photographs, and maps.

Tempe Collections Strengths: 20th Century, Maricopa County and Central Arizona, oral histories, architectural drawings, TV news reels, aviation, banking, healthcare, business, non-profit organizations, arts and culture, photographs and photographic studios.

Yuma Collections Strengths: Territorial era to 1940s, Western Arizona, oral histories, agriculture, genealogy, military, local organizations, education, church history, early transportation (railroad, steamboats, plank road), aviation, business, Lower Colorado River, irrigation, Yuma Prison, and photographs.

Flagstaff Collections Strengths:  Territorial era to 1950s, Northern Arizona and Colorado Plateau, business, politics, law, lumber industry, railroads, genealogy, local organizations, Indian Pow Wow records, education, healthcare, maps, oral histories  and photographs."

AHS libraries are staffed by knowledgeable librarians who can aid in professional research or answer general research questions at the research help desk.

Quarterly journal 
The historical society publishes the quarterly Journal of Arizona History (originally named Arizoniana). The journal is distributed to members and contains articles about Arizona history. Photo essays and reviews are included along with standard articles. The Historical Society additionally publishes books, a list of which can be found on their website.

References

External links
 

State historical societies of the United States
History of Arizona
1864 establishments in Arizona Territory
Historical societies in Arizona
Smithsonian Institution affiliates